William Mackey Lomasney (1841 – December 13, 1884) was a member of the Fenian Brotherhood and the Clan na Gael who, during the Fenian dynamite campaign organized by Jeremiah O'Donovan Rossa, was killed in a failed attempt to dynamite London Bridge.

Born the son of Irish immigrants in Cincinnati, Ohio (although other accounts claim he emigrated with his parents to Detroit, Michigan at the age of 3), Mackey served in the American Civil War and later became involved in the Irish nationalist movement. Travelling to Ireland to take part in the Fenian Rising in 1865, he was arrested by British authorities in Cork and ordered to leave the country along with John McCafferty.

However, upon his return two years later, he and James X. O'Brien participated in the capture of the Ballyknockane Constabulary barracks. He also briefly captured and held the Monning Martello tower near Fota Island in Cork Harbour; this tower is believed to have been the only Martello tower ever captured.  After the rebellion's end, he continued raiding gunshops and coastguard stations throughout Cork for over twelve months before his eventual capture by authorities on February 7, 1868 in which he Mortally wounded RIC Sub Constable Thomas Casey (died 22 February 1868).

Tried for murder and treasonous felony, he was sentenced to twelve years penal servitude on March 21, 1868. While imprisoned in Millbank Prison, he became acquainted with John Devoy.  He was released under a general amnesty in 1871 on condition that he return to his native country.

Upon his return to the United States, he settled in Detroit, Michigan and opened a book and stationery store. A later member of the American Land League, he became involved in the Clan na Gael and had been in France to make a withdrawal from the treasury of the Irish Republican Brotherhood from which he was to return to Ireland to plan for a possible rebellion with Devoy. However, as a wave of dynamite bombings occurred in Great Britain during early 1881, he and Devoy would correspond with each other both condemning Rossa's actions and the idea for a "bloodless revolution" in Ireland.

Under an alias he came to London, with another man who claimed to be his brother. Renting a store as a bookshop, they began their bombing campaign. On the early evening of December 13, 1884, Mackey rowed out in a boat with his accomplice John Fleming with the intention of destroying London bridge. The attack on London Bridge failed when the dynamite they were attaching to a pier exploded prematurely.  The remains of one man were found while the remains of the other man were not found; the Clan na Gael paid a pension to Lomasney's widow and four children. While most accounts claim that three men were killed, a Fenian history website reports that only two were killed.

References

Sources
Golway, Terry. Irish Rebel: John Devoy and America's Fight for Ireland's Freedom. New York: St. Martin's Press, 1988. 
Laqueur, Walter. Voices Of Terror: Manifestos, Writings, and Manuals of Al Qaeda, Hamas, and other terrorists from Around the World and Throughout the Ages. New York: Reed Press, 2004. 
Moody, Theodore William; Francis X. Martin and Francis John Byrne. A New History of Ireland. Oxford: Oxford University Press, 2001. 
Whelehan, Niall, The Dynamiters: Irish Nationalism and Political Violence in the Wider World, 1867–1900 Cambridge: Cambridge University Press, 2012.

External links
Lomasney.net - Capt Mackey

1841 births
1884 deaths
Union Army soldiers
Members of the Irish Republican Brotherhood
People from Cincinnati
American people imprisoned abroad
American people convicted of murder
People convicted of murder by England and Wales
Deaths by improvised explosive device in England
Accidental deaths in London